Jyrki Pellinen (born May 16, 1940, in Helsinki) is a Finnish writer, poet and visual artist. He has published over 50 fiction books, and was the 1988 recipient of the Eino Leino Prize.

References

External links 
 

1940 births
Living people
Writers from Helsinki
Finnish writers
Recipients of the Eino Leino Prize